The 2019 East Cambridgeshire District Council election took place on 2 May 2019 to elect members of East Cambridgeshire District Council in England. This was on the same day as other local elections. The whole council was up for election on new boundaries. The Conservative Party retained control of the council.

Result summary

|-

Ward results

Bottisham

Burwell

Downham

Ely East

Ely North

Ely West

Fordham & Isleham

Haddenham

Littleport

Soham North

Soham South

Stretham

Sutton

Woodditton

By-elections

Soham North

References 

East Cambridgeshire District Council elections
2019 English local elections
2010s in Cambridgeshire
May 2019 events in the United Kingdom